St. Juliens is a designated place in the Canadian province of Newfoundland and Labrador.

Geography 
St. Juliens is in Newfoundland within Subdivision F of Division No. 9.

Demographics 

See also 
List of communities in Newfoundland and Labrador
List of designated places in Newfoundland and Labrador

References 

Designated places in Newfoundland and Labrador